Ascharara Sports Club is a Libyan football club based in Sabha.  They are a member of the top division in Libyan football.  Their home stadium is Sabha Stadium.
The team played in Libyan Premier League in 2007, but were relegated in the end of the season.

Current players 
 Farag Al Gamet

Charara
Association football clubs established in 1958
1958 establishments in Libya
Sabha, Libya